The 2014 Red Bull Ring GP3 Series round was a GP3 Series motor race held on 21 and 22 June 2014 at the Red Bull Ring in Austria. It was the second round of the 2014 GP3 Series. The race weekend supported the 2014 Austrian Grand Prix.

Classification

Qualifying

Feature Race

Sprint Race

See also 
 2014 Austrian Grand Prix
 2014 Red Bull Ring GP2 Series round

References

External links 
 Official website of GP3 Series

GP3
Red Bull Ring